Hans Seyffer, also known as Hans Seyfer or Hans of Heilbronn (c.1460–1509), was a stone sculptor and wood carver of the late Gothic style.

Biography
Seyffer was born in Sinsheim.  Little else is known about his life.  He lived and worked at a dramatic turn of an era (from late Gothic to Renaissance) together with other masters (e.g. Tilman Riemenschneider, Veit Stoss and Hans Brueggemann).  He created many well-known works of art in Heilbronn and Stuttgart (both in Germany).  He died in Heilbronn.

Major works
 1498 the main altar of the St. Kilian's Church, Heilbronn 
 1501 the crucifixion group in the Leonhardskirchhof in Stuttgart (now in the Hospitalkirche in Stuttgart) 
 1502 the grave scene of Christ in the Oswaldkirche in Stuttgart 
 1506-1509 the Mount of Olives in the cathedral of Speyer 

1460s births
1509 deaths
People from Sinsheim
German woodcarvers